Ballads is a compilation album by Earl Klugh released in 1993.

Track listing 
 "This Time" - 3:40
 "Waltz for Debby" - 4:55
 "If You're Still in Love With Me" - 2:37
 "The April Fools" - 3:43
 "Rayna" - 5:12
 "Natural Thing" - 2:54
 "Waiting for Cathy" - 2:48
 "Julie" - 4:31
 "Nature Boy" - 3:37
 "Dream Come True" - 3:35
 "The Shadow of Your Smile" - 5:07
 "Christina" - 4:09

References 

1993 compilation albums
Earl Klugh albums
Manhattan Records albums